Eugnosta marginana is a species of moth of the family Tortricidae. It is found in Uganda. The habitat consists of open areas close to mountain rain forests.

The wingspan is 12–14 mm. The forewings are cream, suffused with ochreous in the basal half. The hindwings are grey, becoming slightly lighter towards the wing base.

Etymology
The species name refers to the dark edges in the forewing.

References

Endemic fauna of Uganda
Moths described in 2010
Eugnosta